Abdellia Palace is a palace located in La Marsa, a town in the northern suburbs of the capital of Tunisia, Tunis.

It is built  in 1500 (905 AH) by Abu Abdallah Muhammad IV al-Mutawakkil when he was in power. In the 17th and 18th century it became a summer residence for the Muradids and Husainids and a fortified shelter from external threats.

Among personalities who inhabited the palace, Mahmud ibn Muhammad (1814-1824), his son Al-Husayn II ibn Mahmud and the British consuls Richard Wood and Thomas Reade can be cited.

References 

Residential buildings in Tunisia
Hafsid architecture